The QW-series are man-portable air-defense systems (MANPADS) developed by the People's Republic of China.

QW-1

The QW-1 is the initial version. It is likely a copy or derivative of the Soviet 9K38 Igla-1 MANPAD.

The system was unveiled in 1994.

Variants

QW-1M
Modernized version. Also used by Kata'ib Hezbollah.
Anza-2
Version developed or produced in Pakistan.
Misagh-1
Version developed or produced in Iran. Also used by Iraqi insurgents and Kata'ib Hezbollah.
Misagh-2
Version developed or produced in Iran. According to some sources, the Misagh-2 may be a copy of the QW-1M.

QW-2

The QW-2 has improved performance against targets flying faster and at lower-altitude than the QW-1.

Variants

QW-12
Uses a laser proximity detonator. Unveiled in November 2014.

QW-3
The QW-3 uses semi-active homing.

See also
 Anza (missile)
 The FN-6 and HN-5 are other Chinese man-portable surface-to-air missiles.
 FIM-92 Stinger
 Qaem
 Misagh-2
 Grom (missile)
 Mistral (missile)

References

Bibliography

Surface-to-air missiles of the People's Republic of China
Weapons of the People's Republic of China
Military equipment introduced in the 1990s